Fairview Pointe-Claire (corporately styled as "CF Fairview Pointe-Claire") is the largest shopping mall in the West Island and one of the biggest on the Island of Montreal. It is located in the city of Pointe-Claire, Quebec, Canada, at the intersection of Trans-Canada Highway and Saint-Jean Boulevard.

Fairview Pointe-Claire attracts 8 million visitors each year. 175 stores occupy about  spread on two levels of shopping space. It is one of Cadillac Fairview's oldest shopping malls. The major tenants are Hudson's Bay, Winners, HomeSense, Sports Experts/Atmosphere, La Maison Simons and Best Buy.

History
Fairview Pointe-Claire was inaugurated on August 12, 1965 with exactly 70 tenants which included Simpsons, Steinberg's, Eaton's, Pascal's, and some 66 other stores.  Notable mid-sized tenants included Holt Renfrew, Ogilvy's and Woolworth's. Fairview Pointe-Claire was a single level mall at the time; only tenants Simpsons, Eaton's, W.H. Smith Books, and Pascal's had two floors. Although they initially had only two floors, Simpsons and Eaton's were both built with the capacity to each house a third level.

At the time of its opening, Fairview Pointe-Claire was the first enclosed shopping mall in the West Island,  the first shopping centre in Quebec with either a Simpsons or Eaton's store, as well as the second largest mall in all of Canada. Simpsons purchased a replica of Michelangelo's Statue of David and installed it in the mall's hallway, a move that was met with criticism.

In 1985, Fairview Pointe-Claire was extensively converted to a two-level shopping mall whose renovation was completed on August 14, almost to the day of its 20th anniversary. The mall went from 88 to 201 stores and its first floor was completely renovated. Among the additions was the introduction of the food court.

Simpsons was taken over by The Bay on January 29, 1989 with no layoffs in the store.

Pascal's declared bankruptcy in 1991.

A Sears store opened on August 12, 1992. It was a new construction built on the south side of the shopping centre. Sears eventually relocated in 2001 to Eaton's former location. Sears's original location is now home to Winners/HomeSense, Sports Experts/Atmosphere, Renaud-Bray, Old Navy and Starbucks Coffee.

On July 26, 2001, Déco Découverte opened one of its first two Quebec stores in Super C's former space.

A Best Buy opened in the fall of 2005. It was built in the place of the torn down Pascal's store, itself having been converted from 1992 to 1998 into an Aventure Électronique Superstore, competing against nearby Future Shop in Complexe Pointe-Claire . Like Aventure Électronique (but unlike Pascal's), Best Buy can only be access from outdoor.

It was announced in September 2017 that the Sears at Fairview Pointe-Claire was targeted for closure along with nine other stores all located outside of Quebec. The Pointe-Claire location closed in December 2017. The first level was repurposed for dining with the food court moving into the space on April 1, 2021. The second and third floors of the location were replaced a year later by Simons on May 5, 2022. The old food court was subdivided for Dollarama and Linen Chest.

Ownership

Fairview Pointe-Claire was originally the joint property of Simpsons Limited and Cemp Investments, and managed by Fairview Shopping Centres Ltd (a subsidiary of Cemp Investments). The mall was built by Cadillac Development Corporation.

In 1974, Cadillac Development Corporation and Fairview Corporation merge to form Cadillac Fairview. From then on, Fairview Pointe-Claire was the joint property of Cadillac Fairview and Simpsons.

In 1984, Markborough Properties replaced Simpsons as co-owner of the mall. Cadillac Fairview retained its share of the mall.

In 1997, Markborough Properties was swallowed by Cambridge Shopping Centres which merge in 2001 with Ivanhoe Corporation to form Ivanhoé Cambridge.

In 2021, Cadillac Fairview swapped the 50% share it held in Galeries d'Anjou for Ivanhoé Cambridge's in Fairview Pointe-Claire to become the sole owner of the mall.

Public transportation
The north parking lot of Fairview Pointe-Claire is home to Fairview bus terminus of the Société de transport de Montréal. A new light rail station Fairview–Pointe-Claire station of Réseau express métropolitain is under construction next to the mall.

See also
 List of largest shopping malls in Canada
List of malls in Montreal
List of shopping malls in Canada
Pointe-Claire

References

External links
 

1965 establishments in Quebec
Buildings and structures in Pointe-Claire
Cadillac Fairview
Shopping malls established in 1965
Shopping malls in Montreal